Sergey Nikolayevich Lebedev (born 9 April 1948) is a Russian politician who has been the General Secretary of the Commonwealth of Independent States (CIS) since 2007. He had previously been
General of the Army in the Russian Armed Forces and Director of Russia's Foreign Intelligence Service (SVR) from 2000 to 2007.

Early life
Lebedev graduated in 1970 from the Chernihiv branch of Kyiv Polytechnic Institute. A 1978 graduate (cum laude) of the Diplomatic Academy of the Soviet Foreign Ministry, Lebedev speaks German and English.

Early career
Before intelligence work, Lebedev served in the Army during 1971–72. He began his career in 1975 when he joined the KGB. He began duties in the First Chief Directorate (foreign intelligence) in 1975.

Lebedev was appointed as Director of the SVR on 20 May 2000. According to news reports, he was appointed to the post because President Vladimir Putin wanted "an intelligence chief whom he knows well and has confidence in". Putin and Lebedev met while serving in East Germany.

CIS Executive Secretary (2007–present)

On 5 October 2007, Lebedev was elected the Executive Secretary of the Commonwealth of Independent States and succeeded Vladimir Rushailo.

In 2019, powers as the Chairman of the CIS Executive Secretary were extended for 3 years.

Honors and awards 
 Order of Bitaraplyk (2019, Turkmenistan)

Notes

References
 Center for Defense Information Russia Weekly #238
 Renaissance Capital Research Portal

KGB officers
Russian people of Kazakhstani descent
Directors of the Foreign Intelligence Service (Russia)
1948 births
Living people
Diplomatic Academy of the Ministry of Foreign Affairs of the Russian Federation alumni
Commonwealth of Independent States people
Ambassador Extraordinary and Plenipotentiary (Russian Federation)
Generals of the army (Russia)